1 + 1 is a duet studio album by pianist Herbie Hancock and soprano saxophonist Wayne Shorter.

Overview
Hancock and Shorter perform 10 compositions on the album, including the Grammy Award-winning "Aung San Suu Kyi", named after the Burmese pro-democracy activist of the same name; "Joanna's Theme", which originally was on Hancock's original soundtrack to the film Death Wish; and "Diana", originally recorded for Shorter's album Native Dancer.  It is Hancock's forty-first album and Shorter's twenty-first.

Track listing

Personnel 
Musicians
 Herbie Hancock – grand piano
 Wayne Shorter – soprano saxophone

Production
 Herbie Hancock – producer 
 Wayne Shorter – producer 
 Tomoo Suzuki – recording, mixing 
 Dave Hampton – studio technician
 Mitch Robertson – studio technician
 Doug Sax – mastering 
 Kathy Lucien – production coordinator, liner notes 
 Melinda Murphy – production coordinator 
 Camille Tomonaro – production coordinator 
 Nate Herr – release coordinator 
 Giulio Turturro – art direction, design 
 Michael O'Neill – photography 
 Theodora Kuslan – liner notes

 Mastered at The Mastering Lab (Hollywood, California).

References 

1997 albums
Herbie Hancock albums
Wayne Shorter albums
Free improvisation albums
Instrumental duet albums
Verve Records albums
Collaborative albums